Bellomo may refer to:

People 
Eileen Bellomo and Tish Bellomo, members of the rock group The Stilettos
Liborio Bellomo, American mobster
Nicola Bellomo (general) (1881–1945), Italian general
Nicola Bellomo (footballer), Italian footballer
Salvatore Bellomo (1951–2019), Belgian professional wrestler

Other 
Bellomo Palace Regional Gallery

Italian-language surnames